Plasmodium clelandi is a parasite of the genus Plasmodium subgenus Carinamoeba.

Like all Plasmodium species P. clelandi has both vertebrate and insect hosts. The vertebrate hosts for this parasite are reptiles.

Description 

This species was described by Manawadu in 1972. It was named after the eminent cardio-thoracic surgeon William Paton Cleland.

The host cells are not altered in either shape or size by the asexual stages of the parasite. Pigment is rare and a vacuole may be present.

The schizonts typically give rise to 8 merozoites.

The gametocytes are elongated with an irregular edge. They tend to encircle the nucleus and the host cell tends to become oval in shape.

Male gametocytes measure 20 micrometres x 2 micrometres and possess 6-8 brown pigment granules.

Female gametocytes measure 18 micrometres x 4 micrometres. The cytoplasm tends to be more basophilic than the male gametocytes. 10-12 pigment granules are found in the cytoplasm.

Distribution 

This species occurs in Sri Lanka.

Hosts 

This species infects the Bengal monitor lizard (Varanus bengalensis) and land monitor lizard (Varanus cepedianus).

References 

clelandi